Michael A. Elliott is an American scholar of English literature and academic administrator. He became 20th president of Amherst College on August 1, 2022.

Education and career 
Elliott received his B.A. from Amherst College in 1992 and Ph.D. from Columbia University in 1998 with distinction in English and comparative literature.

Elliott joined the Emory University faculty in 1998, upon graduating from Columbia. He held a number of administrative posts since joining Emory: he was senior associate dean for faculty (2009–2014), followed by executive associate dean (2014–2015), and interim dean (2016–2017). From 2017 to 2022, he was dean of the Emory College of Arts and Sciences. As dean of Emory College, Elliott led initiatives aimed at diversifying the college faculty and student body and increasing funding for undergraduate research and professional development. He also ran the largest fundraising campaign in Emory College and university history.

Elliott also served as Charles Howard Candler Professor of English at Emory.

Scholarship 
Elliott's scholarship focused on American literature and culture during the 19th and 20th centuries. His books include
 The Culture Concept: Writing and Difference in the Age of Realism (2002)
 Custerology: The Enduring Legacy of the Indian Wars and George Armstrong Custer (2007), which explored how the contested and fractious legacies of  Custer and the Indian Wars continue to symbolize of America's violent past and provide a key to understanding the nation’s multicultural present.
His articles and book reviews include

 “‘This Indian Bait’: Samson Occom and the Voice of Liminality.” Early American Literature, vol. 29, no. 3, 1994, pp. 233–53.
 Review of Northeastern Indian Lives, edited by Robert S. Grumet, Biography, vol. 20, no. 3, 1997, pp. 350–53.
 “Ethnography, Reform, and the Problem of the Real: James Mooney’s Ghost-Dance Religion”, American Quarterly, vol. 50, no. 2, 1998, pp. 201–33.
 Review of That the People Might Live: Native American Literature and Native American Community, by Jace Weaver, American Literature, vol. 70, no. 4, 1998, pp. 900–01.
 “Telling the Difference: Nineteenth-Century Legal Narratives of Racial Taxonomy”, Law & Social Inquiry, vol. 24, no. 3, 1999, pp. 611–36.
 Review of The Limits of Multiculturalism: Interrogating the Origins of American Anthropology, by Scott Michaelsen, Studies in American Indian Literatures, vol. 12, no. 3, 2000, pp. 92–95.
 Review of Race, Work, and Desire in American Literature, by Michele Birnbaum, South Atlantic Review, vol. 69, no. 3/4, 2004, pp. 129–31.
 “Indian Patriots on Last Stand Hill”, American Quarterly, vol. 58, no. 4, 2006, pp. 987–1015.
 Review of Red Land, Red Power: Grounding Knowledge in the American Indian Novel, by Sean Kicummah Teuton, The Journal of American History, vol. 95, no. 4, 2009, pp. 1247–48.
 “Indians, Incorporated.” American Literary History, vol. 19, no. 1, 2007, pp. 141–59.
 “Other Times: Herman Melville, Lewis Henry Morgan, and Ethnographic Writing in the Antebellum United States”, Criticism, vol. 49, no. 4, 2007, pp. 481–503.
 “Our Memorials, Ourselves”, American Quarterly, vol. 63, no. 1, 2011, pp. 229–40.
 Review of A Misplaced Massacre: Struggling over the Memory of Sand Creek, by Ari Kelman, The Journal of American History, vol. 100, no. 3, 2013, pp. 798–800.
 “Not over: The Nineteenth-Century Indian Wars”, Reviews in American History, vol. 44, no. 2, 2016, pp. 277–83.

With Priscilla Wald, Elliott edited The Oxford History of the Novel in English: Volume Six: The American Novel 1870–1940.
With Claudia Stokes, he edited American Literary Studies: A Methodological Reader. Elliott has also been an editor of The Norton Anthology of American Literature.

References 

Living people
American academic administrators
American university and college faculty deans
Presidents of Amherst College
Emory University faculty
Columbia Graduate School of Arts and Sciences alumni
Amherst College alumni
Year of birth missing (living people)